The Abramson House is a historic house at 127 Crescent Heights in Holly Grove, Arkansas.  It is a two-story wood-frame structure, with brick veneer walls and a green tile roof.  Designed by Memphis, Tennessee architect Estes Mann and built in 1921–22, it is a particularly fine local example of Craftsman style architecture.  It is an L-shaped structure, with arched openings (one housing a recessed porch, the other an enclosed former porch) at the ends of one leg, and half-timbered stucco projecting sections with oriel windows.

The house was listed on the National Register of Historic Places in 1995.

See also
National Register of Historic Places listings in Monroe County, Arkansas

References

Houses on the National Register of Historic Places in Arkansas
Houses completed in 1921
Houses in Monroe County, Arkansas
National Register of Historic Places in Monroe County, Arkansas
American Craftsman architecture in Arkansas